Una Viuda descocada is a 1980 Argentine comedy film written and directed by Armando Bó and starring Isabel Sarli. It is a sequel to the Bó's 1967 film La señora del intendente and it was also the last film he directed before his death.

Synopsis
The beautiful and busty Flor Tetis Soutién de Gambetta (Isabel Sarli) has been left almost broke after she widowed for the eighth time. But then she falls in love with Pepe (José Marrone) who has won the lottery.

Cast
 Isabel Sarli as Flor Tetis Soutién de Gambetta
 José Marrone as Pepe Mangiabróccoli
 Jorge Barreiro as Carlos
 Vicente Rubino as Vicente Rodríguez Luque
 Pepita Muñoz as Doña Flora de Tetis
 Elena Lucena as La primera chismosa
 Adelco Lanza as Manolo

External links 
 

1980 films
Argentine comedy films
1980s Spanish-language films
Films directed by Armando Bó
1980s Argentine films